The Leicester Royal Infirmary (LRI) is a National Health Service hospital in Leicester, England.  It is located to the south-west of the city centre.  It has an accident and emergency department and is managed by of the University Hospitals of Leicester NHS Trust.

History

The hospital was founded by Reverend William Watts as the Leicester Infirmary with 40 beds in 1771. Patients were forced to pay a deposit when they went in; if they went home, the money was repaid; if they died their deposit would be spent on burying them. When first opened, there was no running water, but it did have its own brewery, beer from which was used to treat the patients. By 1808, the infirmary had expanded by 20 beds, to a total of 60 beds.

A fever house opened at the infirmary in 1820 and nurses were first trained there in 1870. St Luke's Chapel, which benefited from extensive stained glass windows and memorials, was built in 1887.

The facility became Leicester Infirmary and Children's Hospital in 1911 and Leicester Royal Infirmary and Children's Hospital in 1914 before it joined the National Health Service in 1948.

The Windsor building was opened by the Queen in December 1993 and a new accident and emergency department was opened by the Princess Royal in March 2018.

Dr Hadiza Bawa-Garba, a junior doctor at the Infirmary, was convicted of manslaughter for her part in the death of a 6-year-old boy from sepsis and received a suspended prison sentence in 2015. Although the General Medical Council ruled in January 2018 that she be struck off the medical register, the Court of Appeal decided in August 2018 that she should be re-instated.

See also
 List of hospitals in England

Notes

References

Further reading

External links
University Hospitals of Leicester NHS Trust

NHS hospitals in England
Teaching hospitals in England
1771 establishments in England
Buildings and structures in Leicester
Hospitals in Leicestershire
Leicester
Hospitals established in the 1770s